Burbank is a census-designated place in Santa Clara County, California. Part of the neighborhood has been annexed to San Jose, while the rest consists of unincorporated areas of Santa Clara County. The population was 4,926 at the 2010 census. The area was named for horticulturist Luther Burbank.

The area is also a center for antique stores and is centrally located to Santana Row, Westfield Valley Fair, and also the downtown area.

The area is in ZIP code 95128 and area codes 408 and 669.

Geography

Burbank is located at  (37.320521, -121.931591).

The Burbank District is roughly defined as an unincorporated area along Bascom Avenue between West San Carlos Street and Interstate 280. The area is an "urban island" entirely surrounded by the City of San Jose. KQED, the local NPR affiliate, ran a story about Burbank's status as an urban island, and the local communities desire to not be annexed by the city of San Jose. The U.S. Geological Survey shows the area's name as official on the San Jose West, California 7.5-minute Quadrangle and it has been assigned a feature ID of 277480 in the National Geographic Names Database. It is an areal feature occupying some of the area between I-280 and San Carlos Street extending east almost to Meridian Avenue and west almost to SR17. The area of this district is an irregular shape. Some parcels considered inside the district, including the Luther Burbank Elementary School, 4 Wabash Avenue, lie outside this boundary.

Demographics

2010
The 2010 United States Census reported that Burbank had a population of 4,926. The racial makeup of Burbank was 2,994 (60.8%) White, 135 (2.7%) African American, 64 (1.3%) Native American, 379 (7.7%) Asian, 16 (0.3%) Pacific Islander, 1,049 (21.3%) from other races, and 289 (5.9%) from two or more races. Hispanic or Latino of any race were 2,509 persons (50.9%).

The Census reported that 100% of the population lived in households.

There were 1,877 households, out of which 620 (33.0%) had children under the age of 18 living in them, 688 (36.7%) were opposite-sex married couples living together, 267 (14.2%) had a female householder with no husband present, 135 (7.2%) had a male householder with no wife present.  There were 175 (9.3%) unmarried opposite-sex partnerships, and 40 (2.1%) same-sex married couples or partnerships. 562 households (29.9%) were made up of individuals, and 92 (4.9%) had someone living alone who was 65 years of age or older. The average household size was 2.62.  There were 1,090 families (58.1% of all households); the average family size was 3.32.

The population was spread out, with 1,125 people (22.8%) under the age of 18, 485 people (9.8%) aged 18 to 24, 1,737 people (35.3%) aged 25 to 44, 1,273 people (25.8%) aged 45 to 64, and 306 people (6.2%) who were 65 years of age or older.  The median age was 34.5 years. For every 100 females, there were 100.9 males.  For every 100 females age 18 and over, there were 100.9 males.

The homeowner vacancy rate was 2.0%; the rental vacancy rate was 3.3%.  2,194 people (44.5% of the population) lived in owner-occupied housing units and 2,732 people (55.5%) lived in rental housing units.

2000
As of the census of 2000, there were 5,239 people, 2,027 households, and 1,141 families residing in the CDP. The racial makeup of the CDP was 63.52% White, 2.94% African American, 0.84% Native American, 6.74% Asian, 0.57% Pacific Islander, 19.81% from other races, and 5.57% from two or more races. Hispanic or Latino of any race were 43.12% of the population.

There were 2,027 households, out of which 29.6% had children under the age of 18 living with them, 36.9% were married couples living together, 12.6% had a female householder with no husband present, and 43.7% were non-families. 32.7% of all households were made up of individuals, and 6.4% had someone living alone who was 65 years of age or older. The average household size was 2.58 and the average family size was 3.32.

In the CDP, the population was spread out, with 24.8% under the age of 18, 8.8% from 18 to 24, 39.7% from 25 to 44, 19.4% from 45 to 64, and 7.3% who were 65 years of age or older. The median age was 33 years. For every 100 females, there were 102.6 males. For every 100 females age 18 and over, there were 100.2 males.

The median income for a household in the CDP was $47,226, and the median income for a family was $51,769. Males had a median income of $43,672 versus $32,431 for females. The per capita income for the CDP was $23,232. About 7.2% of families and 10.8% of the population were below the poverty line, including 11.5% of those under age 18 and 4.9% of those age 65 or over.

Government
At the county level, Burbank is located within the 4th supervisorial district, represented on the Santa Clara County Board of Supervisors by Ken Yeager.

The area has been defined by several political entities since 1906 beginning with the Burbank School District, and shortly afterward the Burbank Fire District, which expanded the community far beyond its traditional, political and unofficial boundaries. The Burbank Sanitary District and later the Burbank Community Advisory Council became identifying local political entities.

Burbank Sanitary District
The Burbank Sanitary District operates the sewer collection lines, handles waste collection and streetsweeping in the unincorporated portions of the Burbank area.  Established in 1940, the Sanitary District is the only local government, other than LBSD, specific to the neighborhood.  The District is governed by a Board of five members, elected to four-year terms, which meets monthly.  Legal and engineering services, as well as all construction and maintenance, are contracted out.

Sewer services are provided to other unincorporated areas of the Burbank Community by the West Valley Sanitation District, an independent sanitation district that also services neighboring cities and unincorporated areas.  Waste collection in the other areas are the jurisdiction of the County of Santa Clara. Sewage treatment is provided by the San Jose/Santa Clara Water Pollution Control Plant a joint powers agency of which both districts are members.

Education 
The only public school located in Burbank is Luther Burbank School, a K-8 elementary school located on San Carlos Street and Wabash.  It is the only school operated by the Luther Burbank School District (LBSD).  Founded in 1906, the District celebrated its centennial in 2006.  Burbank-area students attend high schools in the Campbell Union High School District.

Landmarks
The second Burbank fire station, sold in the late 1970s, is on the northeast corner of Scott Street and Flagg Avenue. The unusually-high garage door is the only clue today that the residence was once a fire station. The fire district became part of Santa Clara County Fire Department, (a.k.a. Central Fire District,) about 1960 and is served by San Jose Fire Department under a contract.

The Burbank Theater is another local landmark supporting use of the name. It is no longer a working theater.

The Burbank Business Circle is the name of a unique San Jose owned roadway that runs through the parking lot of the shopping center on the southwest corner of Bascom Avenue and Stevens Creek Blvd. The shopping center currently houses the Bank of the West, Alex's 49'er bar, and long-time landmark Time Delicatessen.

The Burbank Lions Club on Bascom Avenue is a local community service organization. Many businesses have come and gone with the Burbank name, but the Burbank Pet Hospital and the Burbank Press continue service on West San Carlos Street.

Notes

External links
 Map of Burbank Sanitary District (pdf)

Census-designated places in Santa Clara County, California
Neighborhoods in San Jose, California
Census-designated places in California